Pastoral with a Couple near a Fountain or An Autumn Pastoral is an oil on canvas painting by French artist François Boucher, created in 1749. It is held in the Wallace Collection, in London.

References

1749 paintings
Paintings by François Boucher
Paintings in the Wallace Collection
Dogs in art
Sheep in art